Charles Curtis Craig  (18 February 1869 – 28 January 1960) was an Irish Unionist and later Ulster Unionist politician. He was Member of Parliament (MP) for constituencies in County Antrim from 1903 to 1929, taking his seat in the House of Commons of the United Kingdom. The son of James Craig, of Craigavon, Belfast, a self-made millionaire whisky distiller, among his brothers was Northern Ireland's first Prime Minister, James Craig.

1903 South Antrim by-election
Craig first stood for Parliament at a by-election in 1903 for the South Antrim constituency, after the sitting Unionist MP William Ellison-Macartney had left the Commons to take up the post of  Deputy-Master of the Royal Mint. He defeated a Russellite opponent to win the seat.

Craig held the seat through four subsequent general elections.

Antrim constituency
The South Antrim constituency was abolished for the 1922 general election and Craig was then elected as one of the two MPs for the re-established Antrim constituency, and held that seat until he retired from Parliament at the 1929 general election.

Craig was sworn as a member of the Privy Council of Ireland on 5 December 1922, one of two new members admitted on the last day before the Anglo-Irish Treaty came into effect, on 6 December 1922. Although it was never formally abolished, the Irish Privy Council effectively ceased to exist with the creation of the Irish Free State, and on 12 December, ten members were sworn of a new Privy Council of Northern Ireland. Craig was not one of those first appointments, but was appointed on 27 Sep 1923 as the thirteenth member of the Privy Council of Northern Ireland.

In the 1922–1924 Conservative Government, led by Bonar Law and then Stanley Baldwin, Curtis was appointed in February 1923 as Parliamentary Secretary to the Minister for Pensions, and held that post until first Labour government took office in January 1924.

Personal life
Craig married Lilian Bowring Wimble, daughter of the John Wimble, of Long Ditton, Surrey in 1897.

References

External links 
 
 

1869 births
1960 deaths
Members of the Parliament of the United Kingdom for County Antrim constituencies (1801–1922)
Members of the Parliament of the United Kingdom for County Antrim constituencies (since 1922)
Irish Unionist Party MPs
Ulster Unionist Party members of the House of Commons of the United Kingdom
UK MPs 1900–1906
UK MPs 1906–1910
UK MPs 1910
UK MPs 1910–1918
UK MPs 1918–1922
UK MPs 1922–1923
UK MPs 1923–1924
UK MPs 1924–1929
Members of the Privy Council of Ireland
Members of the Privy Council of Northern Ireland